Doors Open Ottawa is an annual event held in the City of Ottawa, Ontario, Canada, that gives the public access to many of the city's unique and historically significant buildings. Among the buildings included are government offices, museums, radio stations, places of worship, embassies, and historical landmarks. It is the second-oldest Doors Open event in North America; after Doors Open Toronto.

Admission is free of charge. Doors Open Ottawa has recorded nearly 850,000 visits since it began in 2002.

More than 140 buildings took part in the 2018 event and over 140 buildings were expected to take part in 2019.

Because of the COVID-19 pandemic in Ottawa, Doors Open Ottawa 2020 was cancelled, and the 2021 event was offered virtually. The 2022 event is being offered in a hybrid format, with some in-person and some virtual content.

Recent buildings
For 2022, V=virtual tour and I=in-person

See also
 Doors Open Canada
 Doors Open Toronto

Notes

External links
Doors Open Ottawa
Unofficial Doors Open Ottawa Mobile Webapp

Ottawa
Events in Ottawa